Oran Mor may refer to:
 Òran Mór, a restaurant and music/entertainment venue that was formerly Kelvinside Parish Church, Glasgow
 Òran Mór Session, a live recording by Scottish indie rock band The Twilight Sad, self-released as a limited edition tour-only CD EP in October 2014
 Oran Mor Pipe Band, a Grade 1 internationally competitive pipe band based in Albany, New York, which was founded in 1992 and was one of the most consistently high-achieving pipe bands in the United States until it merged with the Stuart Highlanders, a Grade 2 Pipe Band based in Boston, MA, late in 2013

See also
Oran Mor also sounds like Oranmore